Jordan is an unincorporated community in Clarendon County, South Carolina, United States. Jordan does not have a post office.

References

Unincorporated communities in Clarendon County, South Carolina
Unincorporated communities in South Carolina